The term pluralist commonwealth refers to a systemic model of wealth democratization supported and facilitated by a variety of different institutional forms. Political economist and historian Gar Alperovitz is generally credited for the development of this model as a way to resolve socio-economic problems associated with corporate capitalism and traditional state socialism. Expanding upon proposals that focus more narrowly on state- versus worker-ownership or state- versus self-managed enterprises, this "pluralist" approach involves large-scale public ownership of corporate equity, worker-owned and community-benefitting enterprises, Community Development Corporations, nonprofit corporations and enterprising state and local public agencies. According to Waheed Hussain: "A pluralist commonwealth is a free-market society in which the economic returns on productive assets improve the lives of large communities of individuals, rather than a narrow elite."

Notes

References

 Alperovitz, Gar. "The Pluralist Commonwealth". http://www.pluralistcommonwealth.org/. The Democracy Collaborative. Retrieved 8/14/2014.
 Alperovitz, Gar (May 1, 2013). What Then Must We Do?: Straight Talk about the Next American Revolution (1st ed.). 85 North Main Street, Suite 120, White River Junction, VT 05001: Chelsea Green Publishing. p. 145. .
 O'Neill, Martin; Williamson, Thad (Mar 3, 2014). Property-Owning Democracy: Rawls and Beyond. 5521 Research Park Drive, Suite 200, Catonsville, MD 21228: Wiley-Blackwell. p. 269. .
 Alperovitz, Gar; Speth, Gustave (Nov 9, 2011). America Beyond Capitalism: Reclaiming Our Wealth, Our Liberty, and Our Democracy (2nd ed.). 6930 Carroll Ave., Suite 501, Takoma Park, MD 20912: Democracy Collaborative Press. pp. 70–77. .
 Garnett Jr, Robert F; Olsen, Erik; Starr, Martha (November 10, 2013). Economic Pluralism. 270 Madison Ave., New York, NY 10016: Routledge. p. 8. .

Economic ideologies
Free market
Political philosophy